USS Paulding (DD-22) was the lead ship of s in the United States Navy. She served in the United States Coast Guard as CG-17. She was named for Rear Admiral Hiram A. Paulding USN (1797-1878).

Paulding was laid down by the Bath Iron Works Corporation at Bath in Maine on 24 July 1909, launched on 12 April 1910 by Miss Emma Paulding and commissioned on 29 September 1910, Lieutenant Commander Yates Stirling, Jr. in command.  She was the first American destroyer to be solely fueled by oil.

United States Navy
Assigned to the Atlantic Torpedo Fleet, Paulding operated primarily off the east coast until after the United States entered World War I. During April 1917, she patrolled off the New England coast and in May, she prepared for distant service. On 21 May, she got underway for the United Kingdom, arriving at Queenstown, Ireland to escort convoys and protect them from German U-boats. On that duty throughout the war, she returned to the United States after the Armistice.

United States Coast Guard
Paulding was decommissioned in August 1919 and remained in the Reserve Fleet. From 28 April 1924 to 18 October 1930 she was loaned to the United States Coast Guard, where she served on the Rum Patrol. The vessel was stationed at Boston, Massachusetts.

Paulding was sent to find CG-238 during a gale in February 1927 off Cape Cod. The  vessel had already foundered, and Paulding spent two days in the storm, losing much topside equipment, including one of her stacks. On 17 December 1927, she accidentally rammed and sank the U.S. Navy submarine  while S-4 was surfacing, killing all on board. An inquiry absolved the Coast Guard of blame.

Returned to the Navy on 18 October 1930, she again joined the Reserve Fleet and was laid up at League Island. She was stricken from the Naval Vessel Register on 28 June 1934 and sold for scrap under the London Naval Treaty.

References

 

Paulding-class destroyers
World War I destroyers of the United States
Ships built in Bath, Maine
1910 ships
Maritime incidents in 1927